Batata is a Canadian-Lebanese documentary film, directed by Noura Kevorkian and released in 2022. The film is a portrait of Maria, a Syrian woman working in Lebanon whose life is upended by the Syrian civil war and its associated refugee crisis.

The film had originally been conceived in 2009, prior to the outbreak of the war, as a portrait of Maria's father Abu Jamil and farmer Movses (Mousa) Doudaklian, two men who built a close friendship through years of working together on Doudaklian's potato farm in Lebanon despite the history of enmity between Lebanese Christians and Syrian Muslims. As the outbreak of the war turned the farm into a desolate refugee camp, its focus shifted more squarely onto Maria, depicting her determination to keep her family safe and united in the face of the larger forces that threatened to destroy them.

The film premiered in January 2022 at the FIPADOC film festival in Biarritz, France. It had its Canadian premiere in April at the 2022 Hot Docs Canadian International Documentary Festival.

Awards
At Hot Docs, the film received an honorable mention from the Best Canadian Feature Documentary award jury.

It received three Canadian Screen Award nominations at the 11th Canadian Screen Awards in 2023, for Best Feature Length Documentary, Best Cinematography in a Documentary (Kevorkian) and Best Editing in a Documentary (Kevorkian, Mike Munn).

References

External links

2022 films
2022 documentary films
Canadian documentary films
Lebanese documentary films
2020s Canadian films
Documentary films about the Syrian civil war
Documentary films about refugees